The Face Men Thailand (also known as The Face Men) is an international Thai reality television modeling competition for males. The series air on Channel 3 since 2017 in Thailand.

At first the executive producer announced on his Instagram they will open casting for Thai and any nationality. Auditions for the show began on 30 April 2017 in F.A.C.E International Festival at Muangthai Gym Live House at CentralWorld, Bangkok. The season premiered on 29 July 2017 on Channel 33HD.

In 2018, the second season open casting calls for male models in South East Asia countries Under the cooperation of MWD Documentary and Kantana Group, such as Myanmar, Cambodia and Vietnam. First casting began in Yangon, Myanmar on 9 June 2018. The winner of audition and runners-up will go to Bangkok, Thailand for get a chance to casting again with Thai and international male models. Audition in Thailand was on 11 August 2018 at Kantana studio, Bangkok.

Season 2 press conference was on September 24, 2018 at Siam Paragon executive producer announced they will have the very first new role for the show as Master Mentor. Every eliminated contestant will be transferred into team Master Mentor. They will be able to attend Master Class, but can't do Campaign. The season premiered on 7 October 2018 on PPTV HD 36.

Hosts and Mentors

Seasons

Mentor's color symbols
 Team Lukkade (Season 1)
 Team Moo (Season 1–2)
 Team Peach (Season 1)
 Team Sonia (Season 2)
 Team Toni (Season 2)
 Team Kao (Season 3)
 Team Jakjaan (Season 3)
 Team Art and Sabina (Season 3)

Thai representatives at Face of Asia

Face of Thailand 
contestant who appointed as Face of Thailand to represent Thailand in Face of Asia contest at Asia Model Festival

See also
 The Face Thailand
 The Face (U.S.)
 The Face (U.K.)
 The Face Australia
 The Face Vietnam

References 

Thai reality television series
2010s Thai television series
2017 Thai television series debuts
2019 Thai television series endings
Thailand Men
Men
Channel 3 (Thailand) original programming
PPTV original programming
Thai television series based on American television series